Almaluu is a village in Jalal-Abad Region of Kyrgyzstan. It is part of the Toktogul District. Its population was 1,295 in 2021.

References
 

Populated places in Jalal-Abad Region